Demonology is the systematic study of demons or beliefs about demons.

Demonology may also refer to:
Demonology 101, a graphic novel
An alternative spelling for Daemonologie, a dissertation on sorcery and demonology by King James

See also
Classification of demons
Daemonolatreiae libri tres